Helms is a surname. It may also refer to:

 Helms Athletic Foundation
 Helms Bakery, an industrial bakery in California from 1931 to 1969
 Helmsburg, Indiana, an unincorporated community also known as Helms
 Helms Creek, California
 Helms Formation, a geologic formation in Texas